A bayou is a slow-moving stream or a wetland.

Bayou may also refer to:

People
 Amal Bayou (–2017), Libyan microbiologist and politician
 Louiza Bayou (born 1994), Algerian volleyball player

Arts, entertainment, and media

Music
 Bayou Records, a music recording label
 Bayou Country (album), an album by Creedence Clearwater Revival
 "Blue Bayou", a song written by Roy Orbison and Joe Melson
 "Born on the Bayou", a song by Creedence Clearwater Revival from the album Bayou Country

Other uses in arts, entertainment  and media
 Bayou (ballet), a 1952 ballet by George Balanchine
 Bayou (film), a 1957 motion picture directed by Harold Daniels
 Bayou (magazine), an American literary magazine
 Bayou Arcana, a 2012 comic anthology
The Adventures of Bayou Billy, a 1989 video game by Konami

Other uses
 Bayou (horse), (1954–1982), an American Thoroughbred racemare
 Bayou Hedge Fund Group, a fraudulent investment scheme
 The Bayou, a music venue and nightclub in Washington, D.C.